Moylan is a surname of Irish origin, anglicisation of the Gaelic , meaning ‘son of the bald’.

People bearing this name include:

 Daniel Moylan (born 1956), English Conservative politician
 Douglas Moylan, Guamanian official
 Edward Moylan, American tennis player
 James Moylan, Delegate from Guam to the U.S. House of Representatives
 Judi Moylan (born 1944), Australian politician
 Kaleo Moylan, Guamanian official
 Kurt Moylan, Guamanian official
 Mary Ellen Moylan, American ballet dancer
 Matt Moylan (born 1991), Australian rugby player
 Myles Moylan, United States Army officer
 Pat Moylan (politician), Irish politician
 Pat Moylan (Cork hurler), Irish hurler
 Peter Moylan, Australian baseball player
 Seán Moylan, Irish politician
 Scotty Moylan, Guamanian businessman 
 Stephen Moylan, American general
 Marice Moylan Wolfe (1935–2022), American archivist

See also
 Moylan, a township in Minnesota
 Moylan, an unincorporated community in Nether Providence Township, Pennsylvania
  Moylan-Rose Valley (SEPTA station), a Pennsylvania train station

References

Surnames of Irish origin